Oldřich Lomecký (September 5, 1920 – April 17, 2011) was a Czechoslovak sprint canoer who competed in the early 1930s. He won a bronze medal in the C-2 10000 m event at the 1950 ICF Canoe Sprint World Championships in Copenhagen.

Lomecký also finished sixth in the C-2 10000 m event at the 1952 Summer Olympics in Helsinki.

References

Oldřich Lomecký's profile at Sports Reference.com
Oldřich Lomecký's obituary 

1920 births
2011 deaths
Canoeists at the 1952 Summer Olympics
Czechoslovak male canoeists
Olympic canoeists of Czechoslovakia
ICF Canoe Sprint World Championships medalists in Canadian